Charles Benjamin Osgood (November 23, 1926 – January 23, 2014) was a Major League Baseball pitcher who appeared in one game for the Brooklyn Dodgers in 1944.

Osgood was one of many ballplayers who only appeared in the major leagues during World War II. His only major league action came on June 18, 1944 in a road doubleheader against the Philadelphia Blue Jays at Shibe Park. He pitched three innings of relief in one of the games, allowing six baserunners but only one earned run.

On November 7, 1944, Osgood was drafted by the Chicago Cubs from the Dodgers in the 1944 minor league draft, but he never again made it to the major league level. His career ended with a 0–0 record and a 3.00 ERA.

References

External links 

Major League Baseball pitchers
Baseball players from Massachusetts
Brooklyn Dodgers players
1926 births
2014 deaths
Sportspeople from Somerville, Massachusetts
Newport News Dodgers players
Trenton Packers players
Montreal Royals players
Shelby Cubs players
Lumberton Cubs players
Macon Peaches players